The Gotha WD.2 (for Wasser Doppeldecker - "Water Biplane") and its derivatives were a family of military reconnaissance aircraft produced in Germany just before and during the early part of World War I.

Design and development
The WD.2 was a development of the Avro 503 that had been built under licence by Gotha as the WD.1, and like it, was a conventional three-bay biplane with tandem, open cockpits. The landing gear comprised twin pontoons and dispensed with the small pontoon carried under the tail of the WD.1. Machines built for the Imperial German Navy were unarmed, but those supplied to the Ottoman aviation squadrons carried a 7.92 mm (.312 in) machine gun in a ring mount on the upper wing, accessible to the observer, whose seat was located directly below it.

In an attempt to increase performance, one WD.2 was built with a reduced wingspan and its Benz Bz.III engine replaced with the more powerful Mercedes D.III. Designated the WD.5, no further examples were built in this configuration, but it served as the pattern for the WD.9, built in a small series. This differed from the WD.5 prototype in having a trainable 7.92 mm (.312 in) machine gun located in the rear cockpit, to which the observer had been relocated. One such aircraft was supplied to the Navy, with the rest of the batch going to Turkey, albeit with the less powerful engine of the WD.2.

The last member of the family to be built in any quantity was the D.III-powered WD.12, an unarmed version which featured greater attention to streamlining the aircraft, most especially around the engine area, which was now provided with a close-fitting cowl and a spinner for the propeller. Again, this type was supplied to both Germany and the Ottoman Empire. It was followed in production by a small number of WD.13s, essentially similar but for the use again of the less powerful Bz.III.

Finally, two WD.15s were built after a considerable redesign of the aircraft. These had plywood-covered fuselages, as opposed to the fabric covering used on all earlier members of the family, and were fitted with Mercedes D.IVa engines.

Variants

WD.2Unarmed version with Benz Bz.III engine,  span wings.
WD.2aA short span version of the WD.2 with  span wings.
WD.5Unarmed version with Mercedes D.III engine (1 built)
WD.9Armed version with Mercedes D.III engine (Germany) or Benz Bz.III engine (Ottoman Empire)
WD.12Unarmed version with Mercedes D.III engine
WD.13Unarmed version with Benz Bz.III engine
WD.15Version with plywood-skinned fuselage and Mercedes D.IVa engine

Operators

Kaiserliche Marine

Ottoman Air Force

Specifications (WD.2)

References

Further reading

External links

 Das Virtuelle Luftfahrtmuseum

1910s German military reconnaissance aircraft
Floatplanes
WD.02
Single-engined tractor aircraft
Biplanes
Aircraft first flown in 1914